Caroline Thomas, (born 26 September 1991 Digoin) is a French international rugby union player. She plays the positions of lock and hooker, with ASM Romagnat women's rugby, and in the France women's national rugby union team. She has 27 caps.

She earned her first international cap for the France team, on 9 November 2016 against England. In 2017, she was selected in the group to compete in the 2017 Women's Rugby World Cup in Ireland, where France finished in third place.

She participated in the 2018 Women's Six Nations Championship.

In November 2018, she was one of the first 24 French rugby union players to sign a half-time federal contract. Her contract is extended for the 2019-2020 season.

References 

1991 births
French rugby union players
Living people
People from Saône-et-Loire